is a Japanese professional Go player.

Biography 
Rin Kono grew up as one of Koichi Kobayashi's students. He became a professional when he was 15 in 1996. He was promoted to 8 dan after beating Keigo Yamashita to win the Tengen in 2005. He was promoted to 9 dan after defending his Tengen title, once more against Yamashita.

Promotion Record

Titles and runners-up

External links
GoBase Profile
Nihon Ki-in Profile (Japanese)
SL profile  

Japanese Go players
1981 births
Living people